Anand Narayan (born 4 October 1985) is a yoga trainer, television personality and playback singer from Kerala, India. He hosted Josco Indian Voice, a music reality show on Mazhavil Manorama.

Early years and personal life 
Narayan is from the city of Thiruvananthapuram. He went to Loyola School and pursued a BTech degree in computer science from SCT College of Engineering. After graduation, he became a software engineer based out of Bangalore.

Narayan married Rajalekshmi Sathikumar on 8 December 2018 at Travancore Convention Center Trivandrum.

Career 
Narayan rose to prominence as a presenter-cum-performer on Amrita TV's Let's Dance. Before Let's Dance, he was a contestant on other music reality shows such as Amrita TV Super Star Global's, Idea Star Singer in 2006 and SS Music Voice Hunt. Narayan has also worked as a show host on Kiran TV and Asianet Plus.

As a playback singer, his first song was 'Mamboo Paadam', from the movie Orkkuka Vallappozhum. This song earned him a Radio Mirchi Music Award nomination for Best Upcoming Singer in 2009. In 2010, he wrote rap lyrics and sang for the Mammootty movie Best Actor. The album won a Radio Mirchi Music Award.

Credits 
 Television
Asianet Social Media Evening Rhythm:Host (2020)
Asianet Social Media Dinner Talk:Host (2020)
Amrita TV Kerala Dance League:Host (2019)
 Mazhavil Manorama Josco Indian Voice : Host (2011–2012)
 Amrita TV Super Star 2: Host (2011)
 Amrita TV Super Dancer Junior 4: Finale Co-Host (2011)
 Amrita TV Style Bhai: Host (2010)
 Amrita TV Let's Dance: Host (2009)
 Amrita TV Super Star Global: Contestant (2009)

 Film Music

 Orkkuka Vallappozhum – Nalla Mamboo Paadam..
 Happy Husbands – Happy Husbands
 Ivar Vivahitharayal – Sunday Sooryan
 Best Actor – Kanalu Malayude

 Movies

 I G Inspector General – Vishaal

References 

 Amrita TV Let's Dance 
 Amrita TV Super Star Global

External links 
 The Adipoli Anand

Participants in Indian reality television series
Indian television presenters
Living people
Malayalam playback singers
1985 births
Indian male playback singers
Singers from Thiruvananthapuram
Television personalities from Kerala